= Symaitha =

Symaitha (Ancient Greek: Σύμαιθα) was a town in ancient Thessaly. It is unlocated.
